Frank G. Dionesopulos was a former member of the Wisconsin State Assembly.

Biography
Dionesopulos was born on January 10, 1935, in Milwaukee, Wisconsin. He would attend the Spencerian Business College. He died in September 1982.

Career
Dionesopulos was elected to the Assembly in 1960 and 1962. Additionally, he was Coroner of Milwaukee County, Wisconsin, from 1959 to 1960. He was a Democrat.

References

Politicians from Milwaukee
Democratic Party members of the Wisconsin State Assembly
American coroners
Detroit Business Institute alumni
1935 births
1982 deaths
20th-century American physicians
20th-century American lawyers
20th-century American politicians